Acid-sensing ion channel 1 (ASIC1) also known as amiloride-sensitive cation channel 2, neuronal (ACCN2) or brain sodium channel 2 (BNaC2) is a protein that in humans is encoded by the ASIC1 gene.  The ASIC1 gene is one of the five paralogous genes that encode proteins that form trimeric acid-sensing ion channels (ASICs) in mammals. The cDNA of this gene was first cloned in 1996. The ASIC genes have splicing variants that encode different proteins that are called isoforms.

These genes are mainly expressed in the central and peripheral nervous system.

ASICs can form both homotrimeric (meaning composed of three identical subunits) and heterotrimeric channels.

Structure and function

This gene encodes a member of the ASIC/ENaC superfamily of proteins. The members of this family are amiloride-sensitive sodium channels that contain intracellular N and C termini, 2 hydrophobic transmembrane (TM) regions, and a large extracellular loop, which has many cysteine residues with conserved spacing. The TM regions are generally symbolized as TM1 (clone to N-terminus) and TM2 (close to C-terminus).

The pore of the channel through which ions selectively flow from the extracellular side into the cytoplasm is formed by the three TM2 regions of the trimer.

Interactions 
ASIC1 has been shown to interact with PICK1.

References

Further reading

External links
 

Sodium channels